The Good Samaritan Society / Good Samaritan Canada is a Canadian Lutheran Social Service Organization that has 60 years of experience in providing continuing care, assisted living and other health and community care services. It is one of the largest not-for-profit, voluntary care providers in Alberta and British Columbia.

Aim
The Good Samaritan Society strives to provide a quality of care that will enable the elderly and the physically and mentally challenged to experience an optimum quality of life.

Service area
The Good Samaritan Society serves over 7500 individuals with 29 locations throughout Alberta and in British Columbia.  The society holds an organization-wide three-year accreditation status with Accreditation Canada through 2011.

History
The society was created in 1949 and built its first facility a long-term care hospital in 1955. Capital development since then in the greater Edmonton area includes five continuing care centres, four assisted living facilities, an apartment building for independent seniors, and many purpose-built or service-provided homes.

In 2001, the society expanded outside of the greater Edmonton area into smaller communities in Alberta and British Columbia. Since that time, GSS has opened programs in Medicine Hat, Lethbridge, Pincher Creek, Magrath, Stony Plain, Hinton, Evansburg, and Rocky Mountain House, and Kelowna, Penticton, Vernon, Salmon Arm, New Westminster, Gibsons and Nanaimo, British Columbia.  Facilities are under construction in Taber, Raymond and Cardston, Alberta.

Organization
A volunteer Board of Directors governs GSS as a not-for-profit health and social services organization. Registered in Alberta and British Columbia, The society is owned by members who qualify for membership status.

Employees
There are 3,500 full-time, part-time, and casual employees and more than 1600 volunteers. The populations served include the independent elderly, frail elderly, mentally challenged, physically challenged, and chronically ill. Service areas include independent living; assisted living; complex/continuing care; programs for persons with development disabilities; Telecare personal emergency response services; rehabilitative services; community care programs and day programs.

Strategy
In 1990, the Board of Directors recommended that the society adopt strategies to meet the service demands, cultural changes, and economic trends that it had forecast.  One of the outcomes was the development of assisted living. The first assisted living facility in Canada, Wedman House, officially opened April 1994.

Programs
The Good Samaritan Society has developed a cottage program for persons with Alzheimer's disease and other dementia.  The society runs community programs, such as day programs and shared living that seeks to assist people in their own homes and communities.

The ministry 
But a Samaritan, as he traveled, came where the man was; and when he saw him, he took pity on him. He went to him and bandaged his wounds, pouring on oil and wine. Then he put the man on his donkey, took him to an inn and took care of him.  Luke 10: 33-34

Organizations based in Edmonton
Medical and health organizations based in Alberta
Christian organizations based in Canada